Liparis loeselii, the fen orchid, yellow widelip orchid, or bog twayblade, is a species of orchid. It is native to Europe, northern Asia, the eastern United States, and eastern Canada. It grows in fens, bogs and dune slacks. It has yellow flowers and glossy yellow-green leaves.

Subspecies
Liparis loeselii subsp. loeselii - Europe, Russia, Kazakhstan, Canada, United States
Liparis loeselii subsp. orientalis Efimov - Altay region of Russia
Liparis loeselii subsp. sachalinensis (Nakai) Efimov - Sakhalin Island in Russia

References

External links

loeselii
Orchids of Canada
Orchids of Europe
Orchids of the United States
Orchids of Asia
Plants described in 1753
Taxa named by Carl Linnaeus
Terrestrial orchids
Flora without expected TNC conservation status